Spiro Malakellis (born 23 April 1968) is a former Australian rules footballer who played for Geelong in the Victorian Football League (VFL) during the late 1980s and early 1990s, then with Port Adelaide Football Club in the South Australian Football League until the end of 1997.

One of seven children, Malakellis was born in Walgett in 1968 and grew up in Portarlington before moving to Geelong where he attended Geelong High School. The elder brother of Tony Malakellis, he started his career at Geelong Amateurs.

After finishing with Geelong, Malakellis spent three seasons playing with Port Adelaide Magpies in the SANFL commencing in the 1995 premiership winning side with his brother Tony.

References

External links
Spiro Malakellis at finalsiren.com
 Image of Malakellis in the peak of his Australian Football career

1968 births
Living people
Australian people of Greek descent
Australian rules footballers from Victoria (Australia)
Geelong Football Club players
Port Adelaide Football Club (SANFL) players
Port Adelaide Football Club players (all competitions)
Victorian State of Origin players